The 1958 Open Championship was held at the Lansdowne Club in London from 27 March - 31 March. Hashim Khan won his seventh title to extend his record and in the final he defeated his brother Azam Khan once again.

Results

+ amateur
^ seeded

References

Men's British Open Squash Championships
Men's British Open Championship
Men's British Open Squash Championship
Men's British Open Squash Championship
Men's British Open Squash Championship
Squash competitions in London